The Danube–Drava–Sava Euroregion is a Euroregion comprising areas of the countries of Bosnia and Herzegovina, Croatia and Hungary. It was established in 1998. The president of the organization is Ferenc Kékes (Hungarian: Kékes Ferenc).

Areas

Bosnia and Herzegovina
Brčko District
Posavina County
Tuzla Canton
Tuzla Municipality
Chamber of Commerce of the Tuzla Region

Croatia
Brod-Posavina County
Koprivnica-Križevci County
Osijek-Baranja County
Požega-Slavonia County
Virovitica-Podravina County
Vukovar-Srijem County
City of Koprivnica
City of Osijek
City of Požega
City of Vukovar
Croatian Chamber of Commerce

Hungary
Baranya County
Somogy County
City of Pécs
City of Szekszárd
Pécs-Baranya Chamber of Commerce and Industry

External links 
Danube-Drava-Sava Euroregion official site

References

Geography of Bosnia and Herzegovina
Geography of Croatia
Euroregions of Hungary